Lázaro Ramón Gonzalo Naranjo [nah-RAHN-ho] (25 November 1934 – 13 January 2022) was a Cuban baseball player who was a pitcher in Major League Baseball.

Biography
A native of Havana, Cuba, Naranjo was signed in 1952 by the Washington Senators, but he did not play for them. Drafted by the Pittsburgh Pirates in 1954, he entered the majors in 1956 with the Pirates, appearing for them in 17 games.
   
In his one-season career, Naranjo posted a 1–2 record with 26 strikeouts and a 4.46 ERA in 34 innings of work, including three starts and seven games finished. As a hitter, he went 1-for-7 for a .143 average, including one double, one run, and one RBI.

Naranjo died from complications of COVID-19 in Miami on 13 January 2022, at the age of 87.

See also
 List of Major League Baseball players from Cuba

References

Further reading
 United Press. "Ike Enjoys Opener: President, Rookie Play Catch". The Pittsburgh Press. April 14, 1954.
 Hernon, Jack. "Roamin' Around: The Kid with a Secret". The Pittsburgh Post-Gazette. March 15, 1955.
 Hoffman, Jeane. "Mazeroski, Naranjo Confuse Pilot Hopper". The Los Angeles Times. June 15, 1956.
 Diunte, Nick. "The President's Senator for a Day". La Vida Baseball. August 4, 2018.

External links

 Retrosheet

1934 births
2022 deaths
Charlotte Hornets (baseball) players
Columbus Jets players
Cuban expatriate baseball players in the United States
Deaths from the COVID-19 pandemic in Florida
Hollywood Stars players
Houston Buffs players
Jacksonville Jets players
Lincoln Chiefs players
Major League Baseball pitchers
Major League Baseball players from Cuba
Nashville Vols players
Pittsburgh Pirates players
Richmond Colts players
Baseball players from Havana